Stichopogon trifasciatus, the three-banded robber fly, is a species of robber flies, insects in the family Asilidae.

References

External links

 

Asilidae
Articles created by Qbugbot
Insects described in 1823